Xīngguāng Dàdào (星光大道 "Star Boulevard", "Avenue of Stars") is a Chinese state broadcaster China Central Television (CCTV) talent show from 2004 onwards. Named after the Chinese name for the Hollywood Walk of Fame, it was CCTV's more “healthy” rival to Hunan Satellite Television's blockbuster Super Girl (TV series) (超级女声) talent show. The host are Zhu Xun and Nëghmet Rakhman. Contestants included singers with more social values, such as blind singer Yang Guang in 2007.

Regular Celebrity Guest 
 Daniela Anahí Bessia
 师胜杰 
 梁宏达 
 老猫 
 黄豆豆等

References

Talent shows